Devesh is an Indian masculine name which means praised  by deities or king of God . It literally translates to "Lord of the Gods". This name is generally used for Lord Shiva or Lord Krishna.

Etymology
According to Hindi, Sanskrit, Bengali, Nepali and its grammar, the name "Devessh" is composed (sandhi) of the two words "Dev" and "Essh". They combine and form Devessh.
Dev (देव in Devanagari script) is the Sanskrit word for "God" or "deity". Essh (ईश in Devanagari script) is also a Sanskrit word for king, head, leader or Lord.

Meaning

A reference is found in Bhagwad Gita which establishes the meaning of the name Devessh. The literal meaning remains "Lord of the Gods", and is used to address Sri Krishna in his form as Vishvarupa.The reference to the meaning occurs in the Bhagwad Gita chapter 11, verse number 25, where Arjuna addresses Sri Krishna by this name.
Also Lord Shiva is called "Devadidev" which means "God of the Gods". So Lord Shiva is also addressed by this name.

In different scripts

Naming culture
As Esh's meaning in Sanskrit is king, Head, Leader who worshiped as Eshwar (God). Probably this belief arises from the fact that many Hindu names that end with "Esh or Ish" actually refer to God.

Notable Deveshs
Devesh Chandra Thakur (born 1953), Indian politician
Devesh Chauhan (born 1981), Indian field hockey player
Devesh Kapur, South Asian Studies professor
Devesh Devendra (born-mumbai vile Parle) Students
Devesh Ramchandani (born-jodhpur) Student
Devesh K Punni

References

Indian masculine given names